Erick Lizon (born November 29, 1985) is a Canadian professional ice hockey player who has played in Ontario Junior Hockey League, Quebec Major Junior Hockey League, United Hockey League, Central Hockey League, ECHL, American Hockey League and Ligue Nord-Américaine de Hockey. He played for a total of five seasons with Wichita Thunder in Kansas, USA and is currently under contract with the Brantford Blast of Brantford, Ontario in the ACH league for the 2019–20 season.

Playing career
Undrafted to the NHL, Lizon played for a year for Streetsville Derbys and moved on to play major junior hockey in the Quebec Major Junior Hockey League with the Victoriaville Tigres making it to the playoffs for two consecutive seasons in 2004-05 and 2005-06. Lizon then continued to play professionally for the Rockford IceHogs of UHL, Oklahoma City Blazers and Laredo Bucks of CHL, the Bakersfield Condors and Worcester Sharks of the ECHL and briefly for the Worcester Sharks of the American Hockey League.

In 2011, he moved to Wichita Thunder for two seasons, making it to the playoffs for both 2011-12 and 2012-13 seasons reaching the CHL Conference Semi Finals. In July 2013, Lizon left the Wichita Thunder and signed a one-year contract with the Oklahoma City Barons of the American Hockey League. After 12 games with the Barons in the 2013–14 season, Lizon was reassigned to the Wichita Thunder where he remained for three more consecutive seasons from 2013 to 2016.

After five seasons with the Wichita Thunder from 2011 to 2016, Lizon opted to leave as a free agent and sign one-year deal with Saint-Georges Cool FM 103.5 of the Ligue Nord-Américaine de Hockey (LNAH) for 2016-17 season.

Career statistics

Awards
2011 ECHL All-Star Game (Bakersfield)
2018–19 ACH Champion

References

External links

1985 births
Living people
Bakersfield Condors (1998–2015) players
Canadian expatriate ice hockey players in the United States
Canadian ice hockey right wingers
Ice hockey people from Ontario
Laredo Bucks players
Oklahoma City Barons players
Oklahoma City Blazers (1992–2009) players
Rockford IceHogs (UHL) players
Saint-Georges Cool FM 103.5 players
Sportspeople from Kitchener, Ontario
Victoriaville Tigres players
Wichita Thunder players
Worcester Sharks players